Mikael Appelgren (born 6 September 1989) is a Swedish handball player for Rhein-Neckar Löwen and the Swedish national team.

He competed at the 2016 European Men's Handball Championship.

References

External links

1989 births
Living people
Swedish male handball players
IFK Skövde players
MT Melsungen players
Rhein-Neckar Löwen players
Expatriate handball players
Handball-Bundesliga players
Swedish expatriate sportspeople in Germany
People from Uddevalla Municipality
Sportspeople from Västra Götaland County